Anusorn Srichaluang (born October 8, 1989) is a professional footballer from Thailand. He currently plays for Pluakdaeng United  in the Thai League 3.

International career

Anusorn played for Thailand U19, and played in the 2008 AFC U-19 Championship.

International goals

Under-19

Honours

Club
Muangthong United
 Thai Premier League Champions (1) : 2009

References

1989 births
Living people
Anusorn Srichaluang
Anusorn Srichaluang
Association football forwards
Anusorn Srichaluang
Anusorn Srichaluang
Anusorn Srichaluang
Anusorn Srichaluang
Anusorn Srichaluang
Anusorn Srichaluang
Anusorn Srichaluang
Anusorn Srichaluang
Anusorn Srichaluang
Anusorn Srichaluang
Anusorn Srichaluang
Anusorn Srichaluang